The Shirvan province was a province founded by the Safavid Empire on the territory of modern Azerbaijan and Russia (Dagestan) between 1501 and 1736 with its capital in the town of Shamakhi.

The province had six administrative jurisdictions; Alpa'ur, Arash—Shaki, Baku, Chemeshgazak—Agdash, Derbent (Darband), Quba—Qolhan, and Saliyan. The capital of Shamakhi had a separate governor, but is not mentioned by the then contemporary historians and geographers to have formed a separate administrative jurisdiction.

Control over Shirvan was firmly held by the Safavids from the time of the subjugation of Shirvan (except for several brief Ottoman intermissions) when eventually the Afsharid ruler of Iran, Nader Shah established firm rule over the area until the area. After his death, the area was divided into various subordinate various khanates, before they were conquered by the Russian Empire from Qajar Iran in the course of the 19th century.

History
Having ended the rule of the Shirvanshahs in 1538, Tahmasp I established Shirvan as an administrative unit of the empire. At the end of the 16th century, the Ottoman General Lala Kara Mustafa Pasha briefly captured Shirvan during the Ottoman–Safavid War (1578–1590) and appointed Özdemiroğlu Osman Pasha as its governor. In 1607, Shah Abbas I invaded Shirvan again and instituted Qizilbash rule over the province. After several interstate wars, Shirvan was eventually captured by Nader Shah in 1734 to establish Safavid rule over the province again.

List of governors

See also
 Shirvan
 Shirvan (city)
 Shirvan, Iran

References

Sources
 

Safavid Iran
History of Dagestan
16th century in Azerbaijan
17th century in Azerbaijan
18th century in Azerbaijan
Provinces of the Safavid dynasty
History of Tats